is a Japanese diplomat.

Education
He studied at University of Tokyo and entered the Japanese Ministry of Foreign Affairs in 1960.

Career
He served as Japanese Ambassador to Saudi Arabia in 1992-1994 and to Thailand in 1996–1999.

External links
 Official Curriculum Vitae of Hiroshi Ota

Living people
1936 births
Ambassadors of Japan to Thailand
Ambassadors of Japan to Saudi Arabia
Place of birth missing (living people)